Bhojuchiwadi  is a village situated 14 km from Kandhar, Maharashtra.

The village has a population of more than 500 people. More than half have migrated from Bhojuchiwadi to cities for their work and lives.

References 

Villages in Nanded district